Dudley Hardy ROI, RBA (15 January 1867 – 11 August 1922), was an English painter and illustrator.

Life and work
Hardy was the eldest son of the marine painter Thomas Bush Hardy, under whose influence and tutelage he first learned to draw and paint. In 1882 he attended the Düsseldorf Academy where he remained for three years. After a further two years' study in Paris and at Antwerp Academy he returned to England to live and work in London.

In 1885 Hardy began exhibiting at the Royal Academy, an association that lasted to his death. His painting, Sans Asile (1889), a view of rough sleepers in Trafalgar Square, was exhibited at the Paris Salon, and the Royal Society of British Artists Gallery in 1893; it was this painting that established his reputation. Sans Asile and his 1889 painting Dock Strike (London Dock Strike), were part of a wider artistic and statistical examination highlighting London poverty.

The preferred subjects for his work became the Middle East and Brittany; painting scenes of desert life and Breton peasantry.  Although not visiting the Sudan he became a 'War Artist' for the 1890s Sudanese War, providing illustrations for London periodicals. His interest in illustration led to the production of French graphic influenced poster imagery, most notably the Yellow Girl advertisement for Today magazine, and Gaiety Girls, a series of posters depicting actresses of the Gaiety Theatre. Further illustrations were for the D'Oyly Carte Opera Company and the Savoy Theatre. Much of Hardy's illustrative work is held at the Victoria and Albert Museum.

In the early 1900s he produced a range of comical postcards, and in 1909 a series of caricatures for the souvenir programme of the Doncaster Aviation Meeting, England's first airshow. Hardy was included by Percy Bradshaw in his The Art of the Illustrator which presented a portfolio containing a biography of Hardy, an illustration of him in his studio and an explanation of his method of working, accompanied by an illustration typical of his work and other plates showing its production. Hardy's coloured illustration shows three different views of a standing man on the north African coast.

Hardy joined his friend George Haité as a founder member of the London Sketch Club; and became the club's president. He later joined the Eccentric Club.

Dudley Hardy died of heart failure in 1922, and was buried at Brookwood Cemetery near Woking in Surrey.

References

Sources 
Borzello, Frances (1987); Civilizing Caliban: Misuse of Art, 1875–1980 – p. 22; Camden Press ; ("...Dudley Hardy pictured the London dock strike in 1889 and the homeless in Trafalgar Square (Sans Asile, 1889). These reports and visualisations were complemented in the 1880s by efforts to collect a statistically accurate picture of the lower classes..."); retrieved April 2011
Breward, Christopher (2004); Fashioning London: Clothing and the Modern Metropolis – p. 85; Berg Publishers ; ("...in selecting Mr Dudley Hardy to design the handsome memento which was distributed in the theatre, the management showed a nice sense of appropriateness. Along with French methods of draughtsmanship, the tone of the French..."); retrieved April 2011
The Burlington Magazine – Volume 16 (1909) – p. 17; ; ("...the work of Mr. Dudley Hardy is popular; this little volume of unstinted praise and plenty of reproductions should be popular too..."); retrieved April 2011
Current literature, Volume 17, p. 219; Current Literature Pub. Co, 1895; ("...Dudley Hardy, the illustrator, is in appearance ... Several of his paintings have been hung in the Paris salon, notably Sans Asile, representing Trafalgar Square..."); retrieved April 2011
Greenwall, Ryno (1994); Artists and Illustrators of the Anglo-Boer War – p. 142; Fernwood Press ; retrieved April 2011
Hammerton, Philip Gilbert (1893); The Portfolio – An Artistic Periodical, 1890, 1891, 1892, 1893 –  p. 8; Seeley And Co. Ltd.; ("...the best things in the first room are Mr. Frank Brangwyn's Puerta des Passages and Mr. Dudley Hardy's Snake Charmers. ... As for the Dudley Hardy, it is bizarre in conception and a little painty ; but it deserved a much better place..."); retrieved April 2011
Hiatt, Charles (1895); Picture Posters: A Short History of the Illustrated Placard – p. 209, 213 248; Kessinger Publishing (Nov 2009) ; ("It is, I think, Mr. Dudley Hardy who, of the three artists named, owes most to France. He has made a variation, a very personal and alluring variation, be it said, of a theme essentially Gallic in its unrestrained gaiety..."); retrieved April 2011
Horn, Maurice (1999); The World Encyclopedia of Cartoons: 2 – p. 158; Chelsea House ; ("...the foundation of the London Sketch Club on April 1, 1898, with Phil May, Tom Browne, John Hassall and Dudley Hardy..."); retrieved April 2011
Howard, Jeremy (1996); Art Nouveau: International and National Styles in Europe – p. 56; Manchester University Press ; ("... the evocation of the underlying forces of nature, as seen in the designs of Christopher Dresser, the posters of John Hassall and Dudley Hardy..."); retrieved April 2011
Johnson, Alfred Edwin (1909); Dudley Hardy: R.I., R.M.S (Brush, pen & pencil series) – 56 work examples; A. and C. Black; retrieved April 2011
Jubert, Roxane (2006); Typography and Graphic Design: From Antiquity to the Present – p. 88, 132, 232; Flammarion; ("...one of them, Dudley Hardy, was a pioneer of the color poster. While a student in Paris, he had been much impressed by Chéret. Some of Hardy's posters present the uniform ground typical of the era..."); retrieved April 2011
The Magazine of Art – Volume 2 – p. 250; La Belle Savvage (1904); ("...in the annual " Landscape Exhibition," held at the Dudley Gallery, there were many excellent achievements by the six ... M. Thaulow, M. le Sidancr, M. Menard, Mr. F. Mayor, and Mr. Dudley Hardy..."); retrieved April 2011
Punch Magazine. Volume 131 Jul To Dec 1906; Punch Office (1906) – p. 42; ("...the Government are, we hear, about to try the effect of more attractive posters by Mr. John Hassall, Mr. Dudley Hardy, and Mr. Tom Browne..."); retrieved April 2011
Salaman, Malcolm Charles (1892); Woman – Through a Man's Eyeglass – p. 240; BiblioBazaar (2009) ; ("...you will find a soothing alternative in looking at Mr. Dudley Hardy's dainty illustrations..."); retrieved April 2011
Sheldon, Cyril (1937); A History of Poster Advertising. Together with a record of legislation and attempted legislation affecting outdoor advertising, etc – p. 77, 80; Chapman & Hall; ("...the beginning had already been made by that time, with Dudley Hardy's poster announcing the new weekly To-day, ... Dudley Hardy, following up his To-day poster with posters for the " Gaiety Girl," was the first British poster artist..."); retrieved 18 April 2011
Wootton, David (1999); The Illustrators: The British Art of Illustration 1800–2002 – p. 66; Chris Beetles ; ("...Dudley Hardy produced a poster for Jimmy Davis's musical comedy, A Gaiety Girl which was produced at the Prince of Wales Theatre. Depicting a leaping figure of a chorus girl in a red dress and a black bonnet..."); retrieved April 2011

External links

London Sketch Club; retrieved 17 April 2001
 

1867 births
1922 deaths
19th-century English painters
English male painters
20th-century English painters
British poster artists
English designers
English illustrators
Artists from Sheffield
Kunstakademie Düsseldorf alumni
Burials at Brookwood Cemetery
19th-century English male artists
20th-century English male artists